Kamula (Kamira, Wawoi) is a Trans–New Guinea language that is unclassified within that family in the classification of Malcolm Ross (2005). Noting insufficient evidence, Pawley and Hammarström (2018) leave it as unclassified.

Demographics
Kamula is spoken in two widely separated areas, including in Kamiyami village of the Wawoi Falls area in Bamu Rural LLG, Western Province, Papua New Guinea.

Routamaa (1994: 7) estimates that there are about 800 speakers of Kamula located in 3 villages in Western Province, with no dialectal differences reported. This is because the Kamula had originally lived in camps near Samokopa in the northern area, but a group had split off and moved to Wasapea in the south only around 50 years ago.
Kesiki, at Wawoi Falls in Bamu Rural LLG (main village)
Samokopa in Bamu Rural LLG (one day's walk from Kesiki)
Wasapea (Kamiyami) in Gogodala Rural LLG (seven days' walk, or 90 km to the south of Kesiki)

In the northern villages of Kesiki and Samokopa, Kamula children were reported as preferring to speak Doso over Kamula. A minority of Kamula people in the northern area also live in Dibiyaso-speaking villages, where they are multilingual in Kamula, Doso, and Dibiyaso. Kamula people in the southern village of Wasapea are also fluent in Gogodala.

Classification
The little data that exists for Kamula pronouns does not fit in with the neighboring East Strickland or Bosavi languages (though 1sg nê likely reflects proto-TNG *na), so Kamula is best left as an unclassified language an independent branch of Trans–New Guinea pending further study.

Attested pronouns are 1sg , 2sg , and ̩pl .

Phonology
Kamula phonology:

Consonants
Kamula has 12 consonants.

Vowels
Kamula has 7 vowels.

Vocabulary
The following basic vocabulary words are from Dutton (2010), Reesink (1976), and Shaw (1986), as cited in the Trans-New Guinea database:

{| class="wikitable sortable"
! gloss !! Kamula
|-
| head || dokupala; tɔkɔnʌlʌ
|-
| hair || kokosasi; kɔkɔsʌse
|-
| ear || molo; mɔlɔ
|-
| eye || inʌma; inoma
|-
| nose || mu; mũ
|-
| tooth || ɛpe
|-
| tongue || te; tɛ
|-
| leg || ɛtɛ; hetei
|-
| louse || iyʌ; iya
|-
| dog || ɛsemala; esemʌlʌ
|-
| pig || ʌľiʌ
|-
| bird || tea
|-
| egg || temoko; temɔkɔ
|-
| blood || umali; umʌ:li
|-
| bone || ɛľu; ɛro
|-
| skin || kapala; kʌpʌlʌ
|-
| breast || mɛmɛ
|-
| tree || dali; tʌli
|-
| man || ɔpɔlʌimi; opřami
|-
| woman || eya; ɛ̃yã
|-
| sun || sali; sʌľi
|-
| moon || mama; mʌmʌ
|-
| water || yu
|-
| fire || deľʌpʌ; dřaƀa
|-
| stone || ewʌľʌ; yawařa
|-
| road, path || api
|-
| name || hi
|-
| eat || dampřoma; tʌɛdɔma
|-
| one || hatropɛ; hʌtɔlɔp
|-
| two || dapiamɛtɛ; depiʌmɛtɛ
|}

References

External links
TransNewGuinea.org database

Kamula–Elevala languages
Languages of Western Province (Papua New Guinea)